Krajna is a roadside settlement in the Municipality of Tišina in the Prekmurje region of northeastern Slovenia.

Ferenc Temlin, writer of the first Prekmurje dialect book, the writer Mátyás Temlin, the Slovene politician in Hungary József Klekl and his cousin the writer József Klekl were all born in Krajna.

References

External links
Krajna on Geopedia

Populated places in the Municipality of Tišina